Muscarella zephyrina is a species of orchid plant native to Bolivia, Colombia, Ecuador, Peru, and Venezuela.

References 

Flora of Bolivia
Flora of Colombia
Flora of Ecuador
Flora of Peru
Flora of Venezuela
Pleurothallidinae